Sommers is a surname. Notable people with the surname include:

Ben Sommers (1906–1985), American philanthropist
Charles Sommers (1862–1922), Australian politician
Christina Hoff Sommers (born 1950), American feminist academic
Dale Sommers, American radio personality and country music DJ
David W. Sommers (born 1943), Sergeant Major of the U.S. Marine Corps 1987–91
Fred Sommers (1923–2014), American philosopher
Helen Sommers (1932–2017), American politician
Jack Sommers (1917–1975), American professional football player
Jay Sommers (1917–1985), American television writer and producer
Joanie Sommers (born 1941), American singer and actress
Robert Sommers (1911–2000), Canadian politician
Rudy Sommers (1886–1949), American professional baseball player
Samuel Sommers, American social psychologist
Stephen Sommers (born 1962), American film director and writer
Tamler Sommers, 21st century American philosopher
William Sommers (died 1560), court jester of Henry VIII of England

Fictional characters:
Jaime Sommers, the "Bionic Woman" of the American TV series

See also
Somers (surname)
Summers (surname)
Sommer, surname